Pen Mar is an unincorporated community and census-designated place (CDP) in Washington Township, Franklin County, Pennsylvania, United States. It is located along the Mason–Dixon line, bordered to the south by the community of Pen Mar Park in Maryland. As of the 2020 census the population of Pen Mar was 947. The community's name is a portmanteau of "Pennsylvania" and "Maryland".

Geography
Pen Mar is located in southeastern Franklin County, on the western slope of South Mountain. Pennsylvania Route 550 is the main road through the community, leading northwest down the mountain  to Rouzerville.

Demographics

References

External links

Census-designated places in Franklin County, Pennsylvania
Census-designated places in Pennsylvania